Reyes del Show is the third season of the 2011 edition of El Gran Show premiered on November 5, 2011.

On December 17, 2011, former vedette Belén Estévez and Waldir Felipa were declared the winners, actress & model Maricielo Effio and Elí Vela finished second, while actor Jesús Neyra and Lucero Clavijo were third. Having won for the second time, Estévez thus became the first two-time celebrity champion of the show. During the final week, most former "heroes" who participated in Bailando por un sueño, El show de los sueños, and two years of El gran show, competed in gamblings where the prize was two 0 km cars.

Cast

Couples
The participating couples of this season were conformed by the first three places of the first and the second season, plus the best fourth position that was determined by the highest average score. During the first week, it was announced that Vanessa Terkes (first season' third place), could not participate for personal issues, for this reason Tati Alcántara (who replaced Maricielo Effio during two weeks in the second season) replaced her.

Previous seasons

Host and judges
Gisela Valcárcel, Aldo Díaz and Cristian Rivero returned as hosts, while Morella Petrozzi, Carlos Alcántara, Pachi Valle Riestra and the VIP Jury returned as judges.

Scoring charts

Red numbers indicate the sentenced for each week
Green numbers indicate the best steps for each week
 the couple was eliminated that week
 the couple was safe in the duel
 the couple was eliminated that week and safe with a lifeguard
 the winning couple
 the runner-up couple
 the third-place couple

Average score chart
This table only counts dances scored on a 40-point scale (the 11 scores were changed to 10).

Highest and lowest scoring performances
The best and worst performances in each dance according to the judges' 40-point scale (the 11 scores were changed to 10) are as follows:

Couples' highest and lowest scoring dances
Scores are based upon a potential 40-point maximum (the 11 scores were changed to 10).

Weekly scores 
Individual judges' scores in the charts below (given in parentheses) are listed in this order from left to right: Morella Petrozzi, Carlos Alcántara, Pachi Valle Riestra, VIP Jury.

Week 1: Disco Night 
Individual judges' scores in the chart below (given in parentheses) are listed in this order from left to right: Morella Petrozzi, Carlos Alcántara, Pachi Valle Riestra, Federico Salazar, VIP Jury.

The couples danced disco. In the versus, the couples faced dancing cumbia, while in the little train, the participants faced dancing strip dance.
Running order

Week 2: Latin Pop Night 
Individual judges' scores in the chart below (given in parentheses) are listed in this order from left to right: Morella Petrozzi, Carlos Alcántara, Pachi Valle Riestra, Fiorella Rodríguez, VIP Jury.

The couples (except those sentenced) danced latin pop. In the versus, the couples faced dancing reggaeton, while in the little train, the participants faced dancing strip dance.
Running order

*The duel
Leslie & Kevin: Eliminated (but safe with the lifeguard)
Raúl & Dayana: Safe

Week 3: Merengue House Night 
Individual judges' scores in the charts below (given in parentheses) are listed in this order from left to right: Morella Petrozzi, Carlos Alcántara, Pachi Valle Riestra, Bettina Oneto, VIP Jury.

The couples (except those sentenced) danced merengue house. In the versus, the couples faced dancing adagio, while in the little train, the participants faced dancing strip dance.
Running order

*The duel
Jean Paul & Carmen: Eliminated (but safe with the lifeguard)
Jesús & Lucero: Safe

Week 4: Tex-Mex Night 
The couples (except those sentenced) danced tex-mex. In the versus, the couples faced dancing salsa, while in the little train, the participants faced dancing strip dance.
Running order

*The duel
Raúl & Dayana: Safe
Tati & Andy: Eliminated (but safe with the lifeguard)

Week 5: Quarterfinals 
Individual judges' scores in the charts below (given in parentheses) are listed in this order from left to right: Morella Petrozzi, Carlos Alcántara, Pachi Valle Riestra, VIP Jury.

The couples performed one unlearned ballroom dance (except those sentenced) and merengue.
Running order

*The duel
Leslie & Kevin: Eliminated
Raúl & Dayana: Safe

Week 6: Semifinals 
The couples danced guaracha (except those sentenced), disco and a danceathon of reggaeton.
Running order

*The duel
Jean Paul & Carmen: Eliminated
Raúl & Dayana: Safe

Week 7: Finals 
On the first part, the couples danced trio salsa involving another celebrity.

On the second part, the three remaining couples danced pachanga.

On the third night, the final three couples danced rumba.
Running order (Part 1)

Running order (Part 2)

Running order (Part 3)

Dance chart
The celebrities and their dreamers will dance one of these routines for each corresponding week:
 Week 1: Disco, the versus & the little train (Disco Night)
 Week 2: Latin pop, the versus & the little train (Latin Pop Night)
 Week 3: Merengue house, the versus & the little train (Merengue House Night)
 Week 4: Tex-mex, the versus & the little train (Tex-Mex Night)
 Week 5: Ballroom dances & merengue (Quarterfinals)
 Week 6: Guaracha, disco & the danceathon (Semifinals)
 Week 7: Salsa, pachanga & rumba (Finals)

 Highest scoring dance
 Lowest scoring dance
 Gained bonus points for winning this dance
 Gained no bonus points for losing this dance
In italic indicate the dances performed in the duel

Guest judges 
From week 1 to 4, a celebrity guest judge was present at the judges table to comment on and score the dance routines.

Notes

References

External links 

2011 Peruvian television seasons
Reality television articles with incorrect naming style